German submarine U-265 was a Type VIIC U-boat of Nazi Germany's Kriegsmarine during World War II. The submarine was laid down on 3 July 1941 at the Bremer Vulkan yard at Bremen-Vegesack as yard number 30, launched on 23 April 1942 and commissioned on 6 June under the command of Oberleutnant zur See Leonhard Aufhammer. After training with the 8th U-boat Flotilla, U-265 was transferred to the 7th U-boat Flotilla, for front-line service from 1 February 1943.

U-265 sank no ships in her short career. Her only patrol began when she departed Kiel on 21 January 1943. Her route took her through the gap between Iceland and the Faroe into the Atlantic Ocean. She was attacked and sunk by a British Flying Fortress of No. 220 Squadron RAF on 3 February 1943, at position .

Forty-six men died; there were no survivors.

Design
German Type VIIC submarines were preceded by the shorter Type VIIB submarines. U-265 had a displacement of  when at the surface and  while submerged. She had two shafts and two  propellers.

U-265 was fitted with five  torpedo tubes (four fitted at the bow and one at the stern), fourteen torpedoes, one  SK C/35 naval gun, 220 rounds, and a  C/30 anti-aircraft gun. The boat had a complement of between forty-four and sixty.

References

Bibliography

External links

German Type VIIC submarines
U-boats commissioned in 1942
U-boats sunk in 1943
World War II submarines of Germany
World War II shipwrecks in the Atlantic Ocean
1942 ships
Ships built in Bremen (state)
U-boats sunk by British aircraft
U-boats sunk by depth charges
Ships lost with all hands
Maritime incidents in February 1943